Mian Hamid Yasin (died 2022) was a Pakistani politician who had been a member of the National Assembly of Pakistan between 1972 and 1977. He was the father of Pakistani fashion designer and host Hassan Sheheryar Yasin.

Yasin was elected to the National Assembly of Pakistan from NW-67 Shekhupura-II as a candidate of Pakistan Peoples Party (PPP) in 1970 Pakistani general election.

Yasin died in 2022.

References

Year of birth missing
20th-century births
2022 deaths
Punjabi people
Pakistan People's Party MNAs
People from Sheikhupura District
Pakistani MNAs 1972–1977
Government of Zulfikar Ali Bhutto